The Finite volume method in computational fluid dynamics is a discretization technique for partial differential equations that arise from physical conservation laws. These equations can be different in nature, e.g. elliptic, parabolic, or hyperbolic. The first well-documented 
use of this method was by Evans and Harlow (1957) at Los Alamos. The general equation for steady diffusion can be easily be derived from the general transport equation for property Φ by deleting transient and convective terms.

General Transport equation can be defined as

,

where
 is the Net rate of flow of   out of fluid element (convection), 
 is Rate of increase of  due to diffusion, 
 is Rate of increase of  due to sources.

Conditions under which the transient and convective terms goes to zero:
 Steady State
 Low Reynolds Number

For one-dimensional, steady-state diffusion, General Transport equation reduces to:

,
or,

.

 
The following steps comprise the finite volume method for one-dimensional steady state diffusion - 

 
STEP 1
Grid Generation

 Divide the domain into equal parts of small domain.
 Place nodal points at the center of each small domain.
 Create control volumes using these nodal points.

 Create control volumes near the edges in such a way that the physical boundaries coincide with control volume boundaries (Figure 1).
 Assume a general nodal point 'P' for a general control volume. Adjacent nodal points to the East and West are identified by E and W respectively. The West-side face of the control volume is referred to by 'w' and the East-side control volume face by 'e' (Figure 2).

STEP 2
Discretization

 The crux of Finite volume method is to integrate the governing equation over each control volume.
 Nodal points are used to discretize equations.
 At nodal point P, the control volume integral is given by (Figure 3)

 ,

where

 is Cross-sectional Area Cross section (geometry) of control volume face,  is Volume, is average value of source S over the control volume.

It states that the difference between the diffusive flux Fick's laws of diffusion of  through the east and west faces of some volume corresponds to the change in the quantity  in that volume.
Central differencing technique  is used to derive the diffusive coefficient of :

 ,

.

 is calculated using the nodal point values (Figure 4):

  ,
 ,

In some practical situations, the source term can be linearized:

.

 Merging the above equations leads to
 
.

 Re-arranging gives

.

 Compare and identify the above equation with

where 

STEP 3:
Solution of equations
 Discretized equation must be set up at each of the nodal points in order to solve the problem.
 The resulting system of linear algebraic equations Linear equation can then be solved to obtain  at the nodal points.
 The matrix of higher order  can be solved in MATLAB.

This method can also be applied to a 2D situation. See Finite volume method for two dimensional diffusion problem.

References
 Patankar, Suhas V. (1980), Numerical Heat Transfer and Fluid Flow, Hemisphere.
 Hirsch, C. (1990), Numerical Computation of Internal and External Flows, Volume 2: Computational Methods for Inviscid and Viscous Flows, Wiley.
 Laney, Culbert B.(1998), Computational Gas Dynamics, Cambridge University Press.
 LeVeque, Randall(1990), Numerical Methods for Conservation Laws, ETH Lectures in Mathematics Series, Birkhauser-Verlag.
 Tannehill, John C., et al., (1997), Computational Fluid mechanics and Heat Transfer, 2nd Ed., Taylor and Francis.
 Wesseling, Pieter(2001), Principles of Computational Fluid Dynamics, Springer-Verlag.
 Carslaw, H. S. and Jager, J. C. (1959). Conduction of Heat in Solids. Oxford: Clarendon Press
 Crank, J. (1956). The Mathematics of Diffusion. Oxford: Clarendon Press
 Thambynayagam, R. K. M (2011). The Diffusion Handbook: Applied Solutions for Engineers: McGraw-Hill

External links 
 Finite difference
 http://opencourses.emu.edu.tr/course/view.php?id=27&lang=en
 https://web.archive.org/web/20120303230200/http://nptel.iitm.ac.in/courses/112105045/
 http://ingforum.haninge.kth.se/armin/CFD/dirCFD.htm 
 Diffusion equation
 Computational fluid dynamics
 Convection–diffusion equation
 Finite volume method, Cheng Long
 Finite volume method, Robert Eymard et al. (2010), Scholarpedia,5(6):9835

See also 
 Heat equation
 Fokker–Planck equation
 Fick's laws of diffusion
 Maxwell–Stefan equation

Computational fluid dynamics